The 8th Standing Committee of the National Assembly of Laos was elected by the 1st Session of the 8th National Assembly on 20 April 2016 and was replaced by the 9th Standing Committee on 22 March 2021.

Government

References

Specific

Bibliography
Books:
 

8th Standing Committee of the National Assembly of Laos
2016 establishments in Laos
2021 disestablishments in Laos